Justice is a parliamentary faction in the Verkhovna Rada (the national parliament of Ukraine), founded by 11 deputies of the Holos party who disagree with the actions of the party leadership.

History
The political party Holos, which was established in May 2019, won 20 seats in the July 2019 parliamentary election.

In January 2021, Kira Rudyk, Yaroslav Zheleznyak and Oleksandra Ustinova began negotiations, moderated by Rustem Umerov, to prevent a split in Holos's parliamentary faction. These talks failed and in June 2021 the faction in the Verkhovna Rada (Ukraine's national parliament) finally split. 11 out of 20 Holos MPs, led by Ustinova, separated into the parliamentary association Justice.

In the 2019 parliamentary election, several Ukrainian Galician Party members were elected to parliament as part of an alliance with Holos. All Ukrainian Galician Party members became member of the breakaway group.

On 17 December 2021, the leader of Justice, Ustinova officially became the head of the Holos faction, instead of Yaroslav Zheleznyak, who represents the party establishment. Zheleznyak did not recognise this official announcement by First Deputy Chairman of the Verkhovna Rada Oleksandr Kornienko.

Unification talks between Rudyk and Ustinova restarted in January 2022.

References

2021 establishments in Ukraine
Parliamentary factions in Ukraine
Parliamentary groups in Ukraine